is a Japanese light novel series written by Tsukasa Fushimi and illustrated by Hiro Kanzaki. ASCII Media Works has published thirteen volumes in the series under its Dengeki Bunko imprint from December 2013 to August 2022. A manga adaptation illustrated by Rin has been serialized in Dengeki Daioh from May 2014 to May 2021. An anime adaptation produced by A-1 Pictures aired from April to June 2017.

Premise 
The story revolves around high school student Masamune Izumi who loves writing light novels. Having no artistic skill himself, Masamune always gets his novels illustrated by an anonymous partner using the pen name "Eromanga", who is known for drawing questionably perverted images despite being extremely reliable. In addition to balancing his passion and school, Masamune is also stuck with taking care of his only family member—his younger stepsister Sagiri Izumi. A hikikomori by nature, Sagiri shut herself in her room for over a year and constantly bosses Masamune around despite his attempts to get her to leave her room. However, when Masamune inadvertently discovers that his anonymous partner has been Sagiri all along, their sibling relationship quickly leaps to new levels of excitement, especially when a beautiful, female, best-selling shōjo manga author enters the fray.

Characters 

The protagonist of the series, he is a 15-year-old first-year high school student. When he was in junior high school, he won an award for writing a light novel series. He later writes a series known as Silverwolf of Reincarnation and hires an anonymous illustrator named "Eromanga", but discovers that Eromanga is his own stepsister Sagiri. 

The heroine of the series and the titular Eromanga Sensei, she is a 12-year-old first-year junior high school student. She is a hikikomori who never leaves her room, even to eat, instead relying on her stepbrother to bring food to her room. She later starts inviting her brother into her room and opens up more to the world, even venturing outside the boundaries of her room. Even though Masamune and several other people know that she is "Eromanga Sensei", she always stalls the conversation by saying she does not know someone of that name. According to her blog, the pen name is derived from the name of an island and does not have any relationship with any ecchi manga. Prior to her mother marrying Masamune's father, she had unknowingly known him as an online friend. In the anime, Sagiri's illustrations are drawn by Tiv.

Elf is a 14-year-old popular light novel author who has sold over 2 million copies. She starts living next door to Masamune and is famed for dressing in a lolita style. She has shown to have developed romantic feelings for Masamune and has confessed to him. Elf Yamada is her pen name.

Muramasa is a successful light novel writer who has sold over 14.5 million copies of her novel series. She is a fan of Masamune's Silverwolf of Reincarnation series, and gets upset after he ends the series. She tried to stop him from writing romantic comedy series but admitted defeat after losing to him in the  competition. She is in love with Masamune, but he rejects her after she confesses her feelings to him. Muramasa Senju is her pen name.

Megumi is a classmate of Sagiri, and a former amateur model. While initially believed to be a perverted girl, however, Megumi is actually quite innocent, and just pretends to be experienced about relationships and the opposite sex in order to make herself look "cool".

Tomoe is a friend of Masamune whose family runs a local bookstore, .

Shidō is one of the participants of the Light Novel Tenkaichi Butōkai competition, but he lost the event since Masamune won first place and he only won second place. He thinks that Masamune is gay.

Kagurazaka is Masamune's and Muramasa's executive editor.

Chris is Elf's older brother and her executive editor.

Publication 
The light novels are written by Tsukasa Fushimi and illustrated by Hiro Kanzaki. The series is published by ASCII Media Works under their Dengeki Bunko imprint, and the first volume was released on December 10, 2013. The thirteenth and the final volume was released on August 10, 2022.

Volume list

Media

Manga 
A manga adaptation illustrated by Rin has been serialized in ASCII Media Works' Dengeki Daioh magazine from May 27, 2014 to May 27, 2021. The manga has been compiled into twelve tankōbon volumes since November 10, 2014. Dark Horse Comics licensed the series in North America and released the first three volumes. In July 2020, the manga became one of seven titles to be removed from Books Kinokuniya in Australia for claims of promoting child pornography.

A spin-off manga focusing on the character Elf Yamada began serialization in the September issue of Dengeki Daioh on July 27, 2018. It ended on November 27, 2019 and was collected into three volumes.

Anime 
An anime television series adaptation is directed by Ryohei Takeshita, written by Tatsuya Takahashi, and produced by Shinichiro Kashiwada and Aniplex, featuring animation by the studio A-1 Pictures. It was announced in September 2016 via a Nico Nico Live stream. On January 8, 2017, Ryohei announced that he will recruit more animatiors via Twitter. The anime aired from April 9 to June 25, 2017. Two original video animation episodes were scheduled to be released in 2018 but were pushed back to January 16, 2019. Aniplex of America has licensed the series in North America. Crunchyroll added the anime series and was available in North America, Central America, South America, Australia, United Kingdom, Ireland and New Zealand.

Reception
The light novel had a million copies in print as of April 2017.

Reviewing Eromanga Sensei, THEM Anime Reviews wrote that between the two principal female characters featured in the series besides Sagiri, Elf is the "better one" compared to Muramasa. The website also wrote, "Elf, like Masamune, is a 'light novelist', and she's apparently much more successful at it than he is. She goofs off most of the time, only doing actual writing when the mood strikes her. Elf is also a bit of an egomaniac- though in fairness, she DOES have a nice smile- and at the beginning of the show she moves in next door to Masamune. Of course she comes to love him- ALL the girls in this show love him. She at least does exhibit flashes of self-awareness, and even humor."

See also 
 Oreimo – A light novel series by the same authors.

Notes

References

External links 
  
  
  at Dengeki Bunko 
  at Dengeki Daioh 
 

2017 anime television series debuts
2013 Japanese novels
2014 manga
A-1 Pictures
Anime and manga based on light novels
Aniplex franchises
ASCII Media Works manga
Book series introduced in 2013
Dark Horse Comics titles
Dengeki Bunko
Dengeki Comics
Dengeki Daioh
Kadokawa Dwango franchises
Light novels
Manga creation in anime and manga
Novel series
Romantic comedy anime and manga
Shōnen manga
Television shows based on light novels
Tokyo MX original programming